The Single mixed relay competition at the Biathlon World Championships 2020 was held on 20 February 2020.

Results
The race was started at 15:15.

References

Single mixed relay